"Concerning Flight" is the 79th episode of Star Trek: Voyager, the 11th episode of season four. Set in the 24th century of the Star Trek science fiction universe, the series follows a Federation spaceship on its way home after being flung to the other side of the Galaxy. In this installment, the crew must retrieve stolen goods.

Actor John Rhys-Davies guest stars as a holographic Leonardo da Vinci.

Plot
An enemy uses a high-energy transporter beam to steal items of technological value from Voyager, including their computer core and the Doctor's mobile holo-emitter. Captain Janeway and the crew track the stolen goods to an alien world that is an active center of commerce. As Tuvok and Janeway beam down to search, Tuvok locates an item with a Starfleet signature: a holographic Leonardo da Vinci, from Janeway's Florence holodeck program, who was downloaded into the emitter. His program is designed to only think in 16th century terms, so he is astounded at the technology. Leonardo speaks of his "patron", who provides him with everything he needs.

Back on Voyager, Chakotay interrogates one of the traders and learns that a man named Tau sells weapons and technology he confiscates from passing ships. As it turns out, Tau is Leonardo's patron. Janeway has the inventor bring her to one of Tau's parties, posing as a buyer, where Tau reveals that he has Voyagers computer core for sale. Armed with Leonardo's accurate topographic maps of the region, Tuvok and Seven of Nine locate the storage facility where the processor is kept, but a dispersion field around it makes transport impossible. Janeway will have to infiltrate the facility and initiate a power surge that will produce a signal strong enough for the transporter beam to lock on. Unfortunately, Tau overhears Janeway talking to the ship and trains a weapon on her. Leonardo knocks out Tau, then he and Janeway flee for the facility.

Once they find the processor, Janeway successfully executes Tuvok's plan, but the arrival of an armed guard prevents the pair from beaming up with the computer. Leonardo is shot, but being a hologram he is unhurt, though he cannot comprehend how. Janeway knocks out the guard, and eventually explains to Leonardo that the world is filled with things beyond comprehension, and it is a poor student that does not eventually surpass their master.

Janeway and Leonardo deduce that more armed guards will be on the way. Instead of transporting back to the ship, they use a site-to-site transporter and beam themselves a good distance away into the countryside. They board a fixed-wing glider constructed by Leonardo and take off just as Tau's guards open fire. Finally, Voyager is able to get close enough to the planet to beam aboard the Captain and her mentor.

Reception 
In 2020, The Digital Fix called the "Concerning Flight" a "delightful holodeck adventure" and praised it for its exploration of Captain Janeway's character.

Tor.com come gave this 6 out 10, noting the actors "Rhys-Davies and Kate Mulgrew being amazing together" but wanting more from the rest of story.

Releases 
In 2017, the complete Star Trek: Voyager television series was released in a DVD box set with special features.

References

External links

 

Star Trek: Voyager (season 4) episodes
1997 American television episodes
Depictions of Leonardo da Vinci on television